Hotshot is a 1986 American sports film directed by Rick King, who co-wrote the screenplay with Joe Sauter. The film stars Jim Youngs, Pelé, and Billy Warlock. Additional material was written by Ray Errol Fox and Bill Guttentag. It is also the film debut of actress Penelope Ann Miller.

Plot
An American football player trying to make it big who turns to Pele, the greatest football player of all time, for guidance. A football player (Jim Youngs) leaves his rich family and goes to Brazil to learn from a master.

Cast
 Jim Youngs as Jimmy Kristidis
 Pelé as Santos
 Billy Warlock as Vinnie Fortino
 Weyman Thompson as Roy
 Mario Van Peebles as Winston
 Leon Russom as Coach
 Penelope Ann Miller as Mary
 Rutanya Alda as Georgia Kristidis

Reception

The movie received a modest reception from critics.

References

External links

1986 films
American association football films
CR Flamengo
1980s sports films
1980s English-language films
Films directed by Rick King
1980s American films
Pelé